Aethiophysa surinamensis is a moth in the family Crambidae. It is found in Suriname.

References

Moths described in 1964
Glaphyriinae
Moths of South America